Ivan Kardum (born 18 July 1987) is a Croatian football goalkeeper, who plays for Austrian fourth tier-side SC Ritzing.

Honours
Individual
A Lyga Team of the Year: 2018

References

External links
 

1987 births
Living people
Footballers from Osijek
Association football goalkeepers
Croatian footballers
Croatia youth international footballers
NK Osijek players
HNK Vukovar '91 players
NK Grafičar Vodovod players
FK Austria Wien players
NK Slaven Belupo players
FK Sūduva Marijampolė players
SC Ritzing players
Croatian Football League players
Austrian Regionalliga players
A Lyga players
Austrian Landesliga players
Croatian expatriate footballers
Expatriate footballers in Austria
Croatian expatriate sportspeople in Austria
Expatriate footballers in Lithuania
Croatian expatriate sportspeople in Lithuania